Jay Township may refer to:

 Jay Township, Martin County, Minnesota
 Jay Township, Elk County, Pennsylvania

Township name disambiguation pages